Thimlapura Wildlife Sanctuary is located in the Madhugiri and Koratagere Taluk of Tumkur in the state of Karnataka. It was declared a wildlife sanctuary under Section 36-A of the Wild Life (Protection) Act, 1972. It is inhabited by leopards, sloth bears, wild boars, Indian foxes, wolves, among other animals. Thimlapura Wildlife Sanctuary is a conservation reserve for sloth bear.

Location 
Thimlapura Wildlife Sanctuary is situated in Tumkur district of Karnataka. It spans over an area of 50.86 km2.

References 

Geography of Tumkur district
Wildlife sanctuaries in Karnataka